The Andorran Supercup is the football Supercup of Andorra.

History
It has been played since 2003. It is a single match at the beginning of the season between the winners of the Andorran First Division and the Andorran Cup. Every match is played in the Aixovall, Andorra la Vella.

Results of the finals

Performance by club

External links 
 RSSSF - Andorran Supercup results
Andorra Supercup summary(SOCCERWAY)

 
S
Albania
Recurring sporting events established in 2003
2003 establishments in Andorra